Andreas Jonson Kaddeland (7 January 1858 – 5 July 1943) was a Norwegian physician and politician for the Liberal Party.

He was born in Holme, and spent most of his life as a farmer. He was a member of Holme municipal council from 1896, and served as mayor for some time. He was a deputy representative to the Norwegian Parliament from the constituency of Mandalen during the term 1913–1915. In February 1913, upon the death of representative Thore Torkildsen Foss, Kaddeland became a full representative.

References

1858 births
1943 deaths
Members of the Storting
Liberal Party (Norway) politicians
Mayors of places in Vest-Agder